Al Schwartz may refer to:

 Al Schwartz (producer) (born 1932), American television producer
 Al Schwartz (writer) (1910–1988), American screenwriter, television producer, and director
 Alan Schwartz (born 1950/1951), American executive
 Albert Schwartz (swimmer) (1907–1986), American swimmer
 Albert Schwartz (1923–1992), American zoologist
 Allen G. Schwartz (1934–2003), American federal judge
 Aloysius Schwartz (1930–1992), American priest
 Alvin Schwartz (children's author) (1927–1992), American author and illustrator of children's books
 Alvin Schwartz (comics) (1916–2011), American comic-book writer

See also
 Schwartz (surname)